Trevor Davey (5 July 1926 – 13 February 2012) was a Member of Parliament from Gisborne in the North Island of New Zealand who represented the Labour Party.

Biography

Davey was born in Didsbury, Lancashire, England, in 1926, the son of H. W. Davey. He received his education at Chorlton High School. Davey was a member of the 6th Airborne Division from 1946 to 1948. He married Mavis Birch Baxter in Manchester in 1949, the daughter of H. A. Baxter. They had one son.

He was the managing director of Queen's Hall, Leeds between 1956 and 1966. Davey emigrated to New Zealand with his wife and son in 1966.

Davey served on the Gisborne City Council from 1971 to 1974 where he was a member of the council's works, library, town planning and airport committees. He was awarded the New Zealand 1990 Commemoration Medal for service to the community.

Davey was a governor of both Gisborne Boys' and Gisborne Girls' High Schools. He was on the executive of the New Zealand Red Cross (1972–1973).

References

1926 births
2012 deaths
People from Didsbury
English emigrants to New Zealand
Members of the New Zealand House of Representatives
New Zealand MPs for North Island electorates
New Zealand Labour Party MPs
New Zealand city councillors
New Zealand businesspeople
People from Gisborne, New Zealand
Unsuccessful candidates in the 1969 New Zealand general election
Unsuccessful candidates in the 1975 New Zealand general election